Dr. Martin LeBoldus High School is a Catholic secondary school located in the Hillsdale neighbourhood of south Regina, Saskatchewan, Canada. It is a part of Regina Catholic Schools. Opened February 1, 1976, it replaced the nearby girls' and boys' separate schools. It was named after Martin LeBoldus, former provincial coroner and longtime trustee of the Regina Catholic school system. The school serves students from most of the neighbourhoods in the central, south and east communities of Regina. It also offers a dual track French immersion program.

There are six feeder schools: Deshaye Catholic School, Holy Rosary School, St. Elizabeth School, St. Kateri Tekakwitha School, St. Matthew School, and St. Pius X School.

Notable alumni
Simon Bairu, long-distance runner
Tamon George, CFL player
Lynn Kanuka-Williams, track & field, Olympic bronze medalist
Tatiana Maslany, Canadian actress
Mark McMorris, professional snowboarder, Olympic bronze medalist
D. T. H. van der Merwe, professional rugby union player
Paul Woldu, CFL player
Alexandra Wrubleski, road cyclist

Affiliated communities
Albert Park (pop. 11,450)
Arcola East - North (pop. 9995)
Arcola East - South (pop. 7665)
Boothill (pop. 2765)
Cathedral (pop. 7085)
Core Area (pop. 4430)
Gladmer Park (pop. 1470)
Hillsdale (pop. 5795)
Lakeview (pop. 7600)
Whitmore Park (pop. 6425)

External links
Dr. Martin LeBoldus High School

High schools in Regina, Saskatchewan
Catholic secondary schools in Saskatchewan
Educational institutions established in 1976
1976 establishments in Saskatchewan